New York State Route 138 (NY 138) is a  long state highway in Westchester County, New York. It begins in the town of Somers at NY 100 and ends at NY 121 west of the hamlet of Waccabuc. The road passes by the shopping center at Golden's Bridge.

Route description

NY 138 begins at an intersection with NY 100 in the town of Somers. NY 138 proceeds southeast away from NY 100 through dense woods in the town of Somers, bending farther southeast and crossing over the Muscoot Reservoir near Bridge L-158 into the town of Lewisboro. Now in Lewisboro, NY 138 enters the hamlet of Golden's Bridge, where it crosses north of the parking lot for the Metro-North station. After passing the station entranceway, the route crosses over I-684, which is connected only by a ramp to the southbound lanes. Immediately after I-684, NY 138 crosses a grade-separated junction with NY 22.

Past NY 22, NY 138 continues east through Lewisboro, remaining a two-lane residential road. Passing north of Lake Katonah, the route reaches a junction with Increase Miller Road, where it turns northeast past Fox Valley Park. After this northeast turn, the route reaches a junction with NY 121, marking the eastern terminus of NY 138, whose right-of-way continues east as Chapel Road.

History
The roadways that make up NY 138 were first upgraded to state highway standards from 1910 to 1912. The portion of NY 138 from NY 100 to a creek west of the Golden's Bridge station along with NY 100 from NY 138 to US 202 in Croton Falls was designated as unsigned State Highway 775 (SH 775). The alignment of SH 775 was first given a contract on February 19, 1910 to construct the  segment of highway at the cost of $48,714.64 (1910 USD). This section was completed on January 4, 1911, less than eleven months after the contract was let. The other major portion of NY 138, SH 770, covered a small portion east of SH 775 and all of the modern designation out to NY 121. The contract for SH 770 was let May 13, 1910 and completed on January 23, 1912 at the cost of $54,794.77 (1912 USD), half of which was paid by the state. 

NY 138 was established in the 1930 state highway renumbering and has not had any major changes since.

Major intersections

See also

References

External links

138
Transportation in Westchester County, New York